Nicholas Frankau (born 16 July 1954) is an English actor best known for playing the role of Flt. Lt. Carstairs in the British sitcom 'Allo 'Allo! whose recurring theme involves failure to get back to Britain.

Early life and career
Frankau attended Harrow School and graduated in 1976 from St. Catharine's College, Cambridge. Apart from Allo Allo, Frankau appeared in Blake's 7 (1980), Play for Today (1983 and 1984) and C.A.T.S. Eyes (1985), among others.

During the 1980s he worked as a supply teacher, teaching Maths in the Jewish Free School in Camden Town and Coleridge Community College in Cambridge. He also taught at County Upper School, Bury St Edmunds in the '90s, and Newmarket Upper School, Newmarket, Suffolk. He no longer acts regularly but lives and works in Cambridge working as a software engineer, having previously worked for Qualcomm, Nokia and Symbian.

References

External links

Living people
English male television actors
English people of German-Jewish descent
People educated at Harrow School
Alumni of St Catharine's College, Cambridge
1954 births
People from Stockport
Frankau family